The Mount Rose Distillery Archaeological Site is a  archaeological site located at 192 Pennington-Rocky Hill Road in the Mount Rose section of  Hopewell Township in Mercer County, New Jersey, United States. The site was added to the National Register of Historic Places on December 12, 1996, for its significance in archaeology and industry, in particular the history of cider milling and distilleries.

History and description
The Mount Rose Distillery, also known as the Cider Mill, is a two-story brick building constructed . It was used for storage and administration of the distillery operation. The distillery works were operated by local Mount Rose families, the Drakes and the Stouts, from the 1840s to the 1920s, producing peach brandy, apple cider, and apple whiskey.

See also
National Register of Historic Places listings in Mercer County, New Jersey

References

External links

Hopewell Township, Mercer County, New Jersey
Distilleries in New Jersey
National Register of Historic Places in Mercer County, New Jersey
Archaeological sites on the National Register of Historic Places in New Jersey
New Jersey Register of Historic Places